Ramón Silvestre Verea Aguiar y García (Curantes, 11 December 1833 – Buenos Aires, 6 February 1899) was a Galician journalist, engineer and writer, known as the inventor of a calculator with an internal multiplication table (1878).

Works

Novels
La cruz de Cobblestone.
Una mujer con dos maridos.

Essays
Artículos filosóficos y cartas a un campesino. Los Angeles: "La Aurora," Librería Mexicana, [1909]
La religión universal: artículos, críticas y polémicas, publicados en El Progreso en 1886–87. Dios y la creación (inédito), Nueva York: Impr. el Poligloto, 1891.
Catecismo librepensador, ó Cartas a un campesino... Nueva York: Imprenta "El polígloto", 1894 y Managua, Tipografía nacional, 1894; reimpreso con otro título: Catecismo libre-pensador. Cartas a un campesino. San Salvador: Imp. R. Reyes [1923]
En defensa de España, cuestiones de Cuba, Venezuela, "América para los Americanos"... Guatemala: Sánchez y de Guise, 1896.

References

Notes
Biography of Ramón Verea
Calculating machine of Ramón Verea
Reportaje sobre él en El País, 4 de agosto de 2013
Un gallego inventó la calculadora, artículo aparecido en La Voz de Galicia el 30 de diciembre de 2004.
Imagen de la máquina de calcular de Verea 
Ramon Verea's Internal Multiplication Table

19th-century Spanish journalists
19th-century engineers
Spanish engineers
Spanish inventors
Scientists from Galicia (Spain)
19th-century inventors
19th-century Spanish novelists
19th-century Spanish male writers
Spanish male novelists
Spanish male journalists